Kim Soo-Beom (Hanja: 金洙範; born 2 October 1990) is a South Korean footballer who plays as defender for Jeonnam Dragons.

Club career

Gwangju FC
Kim was selected in the priority pick of the 2011 K-League Draft by Gwangju FC.

Jeju United
Kim was picked up by Jeju United in 2014, playing mostly off the bench.

Perth Glory
On 30 July 2019, Kim transferred to Australian club Perth Glory, signing a one-year contract.

Gangwon FC
On 25 June 2020, it was announced that Kim left Perth Glory, and returned to South Korea, joining local club Gangwon FC.

References

External links 

1990 births
Living people
South Korean footballers
Gwangju FC players
Jeju United FC players
Perth Glory FC players
Gangwon FC players
K League 2 players
K League 1 players
A-League Men players
Association football defenders